The Daily Independent may refer to:
 The Daily Independent (Ashland newspaper), a daily newspaper published in Kentucky, USA
 The Daily Independent (Lagos newspaper), a newspaper published in Lagos, Nigeria
 The Daily Independent (Ridgecrest), a daily newspaper published in California, USA
 The Daily Independent, a daily newspaper published in Sun City, Arizona

See also
 The Independent, a daily newspaper published in the United Kingdom
 The Independent (Bangladesh newspaper), a daily newspaper published in Dhaka, Bangladesh
 Irish Independent, Ireland's largest daily newspaper
 Independent Tribune, a newspaper published in Concord, North Carolina, USA
 Marin Independent Journal, formerly the San Rafael Daily Independent in California, USA
 Gallup Independent, a newspaper published in Gallup, New Mexico, USA